Georgios Vizyinos (Greek: Γεώργιος Βιζυηνός, March 8, 1849 - April 15, 1896) was a Greek short story writer and poet. He is considered highly influential in Greek literature.

References

External links
 

Greek short story writers
Greek poets
1849 births
1896 deaths

Giorgos Viziinos (Bidsi (a small town in Kırklareli called Vize today, 1849 - Athens, 1896) (Greek, Γεώργιος Βιζυηνός, in Spanish phonetic transcription, Yorgos Bidsinós) (Greek poet, narrator and intellectual considered one of the main representatives of modern Greek literature. / p> Biography He was born into a very poor family in the small town of Bidsi (Βιζύη), eastern Thrace, in 1849. At the age of twelve his parents sent him to Constantinople to learn the trade of tailor with his uncle. He remained at the Golden Gate until the age of nineteen, under the protection of Cypriot Syndicate Giango Georgiadi (Γιάγκος Γεωργιάδης) and later Cypriot Archbishop Sofronius (Σωφρονίος), who sent him a season to the island with the intention of preparing him for the ecclesiastical career.
In 1872 he began his studies in theology at the Seminary of Halki, the most important of Eastern Christianity, located on the small island of the Marmara Sea. A year later he published his first collection of poems: Primicias poéticas (Ποιητικά Πρωτόλεια). Among his professors is the poet Helias Tandalidis (Ηλίας Τανταλίδης), who values the sensitivity and talent of the young Viziinos and introduces him to Giorgos Zarifis (Γεώργιος Ζαρίφης), one of the great patrons of Hellenism in Asia Minor.
In 1874 his epic poem Kodros (Κόδρος) was awarded one of the most important prizes of the time. In the same year he joins the Philosophy School of Athens, but thanks to the help of Zarifis he travels to Göttingen (Germany) where he studies Philosophy and Philology for four years.
In the following years he published several more poems: Breezes of the Bosphorus (Βοσπορίδες αύραι, also titled Άραις μάραις κουκουνάραις, 1876), Espérides (Εσπερίδες, 1877), Athenian Breezes (Ατθίδες Αύραι, 1883).
In 1881 his doctoral thesis appears in Leipzig, where he studies the psychology of children's play (Das Kinderspiel in Bezug auf Psychologie und Paedagogik). In those years travels by different European cities: Paris, London, where it knows great personalities of the Greek Diaspora. In 1883 he published in the important magazine Hestía his first stories, that would procure a great success to him: The sin of my mother, Between Naples and Piraeus and Who was the assassin of my brother (Το αμάρτημα της μητρός μου, Μεταξύ Πειραιώς και Νεαπόλεως και το Ποίος ήτο ο φονεύς του αδερφού μου;). In 1884, because of the death of his protector Zarifis, returns to Athens where he obtains a position of professor of institute.
A year later he joined the Chair of Philosophy with a study on the idea of ​​Good in [[Plotinus. In the same year he published his following accounts: The consequences of ancient history, The only journey of his life and One of May (Αι συνέπεια της παλαιάς ιστορίας, Το μόνον της ζωής του ταξίδιον και Πρωτομαγιά). In 1886 he wrote his last short story: Moskov Selim (Μοσκώβ Σελήμ). In 1892 he is admitted because of a cerebral crisis. After four years of incarceration in the hospital, he died in April 1896.